Gastrotheca andaquiensis, commonly known as the Andes marsupial frog, is a species of frog in the family Hemiphractidae. It is found on the Amazonian slopes of Andes in southern Colombia and Ecuador.

Description
The head has a rounded snout, a slightly projecting upper lip, a large pit below each nostril, and bluntly-pointed horn-like appendages above the eyes. The tympani are ovoid and prominent. The body is robust, with a granular skin and a mixture of larger and smaller granules. There is a deeply-sunk slit opening in the scapular region of the back leading into a brood pouch. There are spines on the heels and both fingers and toes are equipped with adhesive discs. In general, males are brown and females are green, but there is considerable variation between individuals, and a part-grown male has been observed which was pale green suffused with bronze. The irises are pale green, the tongue and interior of the mouth are blue, and the discs on fingers and toes are jade green.

Distribution and habitat
Gastrotheca andaquiensis is endemic to Colombia and Ecuador on the eastern foothills of the Andes. It is an arboreal frog occurring in cloud forest in foliage near water where there are trees with plenty of epiphytic growth.

Ecology
This species is called a marsupial frog because the female carries the eggs and developing froglets in the pouch on her back. About ten large eggs are laid in a clutch and after fertilisation, the male assists the female to insert them into her pouch. Here they develop directly into juvenile frogs without an intervening tadpole stage, eventually hopping away from their mother.

Status
This frog has a wide range and is a moderately common species in at least parts of its range. The main threats it faces include habitat loss from livestock grazing and crop cultivation but its range includes a number of protected areas. The International Union for Conservation of Nature has rated its conservation status as being of "least concern", because any decrease in population size is likely to be at too slow a rate to justify classifying it in a more threatened category.

References

andaquiensis
Frogs of South America
Amphibians of the Andes
Amphibians of Colombia
Amphibians of Ecuador
Amphibians described in 1976
Taxonomy articles created by Polbot